The  is part of the Hokkaido Railway Company network in Hokkaidō, Japan. It connects Furano Station in the city of Furano and Asahikawa Station in the city of Asahikawa. Popular with tourists, it has recently come to serve commuters in the bedroom towns that are developing as suburbs of Asahikawa.

History
In the next month, service extended to Kami-Furano Station, and in the following year it reached Shimo-Furano Station.

In 1909 it became part of the Nemuro Main Line from Asahikawa Station to Kushiro Station, but in 1913 it took its present name and covered the route from Asahikawa Station to Shimo-Furano Station. The eruption of Mount Tokachi on May 24, 1926, caused a protracted interruption of service between Biei and Kami-Furano. In 1942, Shimo-Furano Station changed its name to Furano Station.

On April 1, 1987, with the breakup of the Japanese National Railways, the line became part of the Hokkaido Railways. In 2007, the station-numbering plan took effect.

On November 19, 2016, JR Hokkaido's President announced plans to rationalise the network by up to 1,237 km, or ~50% of the current network, including the proposed conversion to Third Sector operation of the Furano Line, but if local governments protest this decision, the line will face closure.

Former connecting lines
The private Asahikawa Electric Railway line to Higashikawa (15.5 km) branched from the Furano line south of Asahikawa station, operating from 1927-73. A 6.7 km branch to Asahiyama Park operated from 1930-73. Both lines were electrified at 600 V DC.

Operations
All trains are local trains within the Furano Line which operate only within the Furano Line, half covering the route between Asahikawa and Biei. Nearly all rolling stock is KiHa 150 Diesel Multiple Units. On 18 March 2023, 38 H100 series trainsets were introduced to the Furano Line.

Stations
Station numbers, names, other lines serving the stations and line distances from Asahikawa are as follows. Other than seasonal Lavender Farm, trains may also randomly skip stations marked "◌".

References

 This article incorporates material from 富良野線 (Furano-sen) in the Japanese Wikipedia, retrieved on June 22, 2019.

External links
Route Map JR Hokkaido.
北海道ふるさとの駅 The Hokkaido Shimbun Press.

Rail transport in Hokkaido
Lines of Hokkaido Railway Company